In mathematics, a Barnes integral or Mellin–Barnes integral is a contour integral involving a product of gamma functions. They are closely related to generalized hypergeometric series.

The integral is usually taken along a contour which is a deformation of the imaginary axis passing to the right of all poles of factors of the form Γ(a + s) and to the left of all poles of factors of the form Γ(a − s).

Hypergeometric series
The hypergeometric function is given as a Barnes integral  by 

see also . Given proper convergence conditions, one can relate more general Barnes' integrals and generalized hypergeometric functions pFq in a similar way .

Barnes lemmas
The first Barnes lemma  states

This is an analogue of Gauss's 2F1 summation formula, and also an extension of Euler's beta integral.  The integral in it is sometimes called Barnes's beta integral. 

The second Barnes lemma  states

where e = a + b + c − d + 1.  This is an analogue of Saalschütz's summation formula.

q-Barnes integrals
There are analogues of Barnes integrals for basic hypergeometric series, and many of the other results can also be extended to this case .

References

 (there is a 2008 paperback with )

Special functions
Hypergeometric functions